Tre Manders (born 30 January 1995) is a Bermudian cricketer. He played in the 2014 ICC World Cricket League Division Three tournament. In April 2018, he was named in Bermuda's squad for the 2018 ICC World Cricket League Division Four tournament in Malaysia. In November 2019, he was named in Bermuda's squad for the Cricket World Cup Challenge League B tournament in Oman. He made his List A debut, for Bermuda against Hong Kong, on 3 December 2019.

In October 2021, he was named in Bermuda's Twenty20 International (T20I) squad for the 2021 ICC Men's T20 World Cup Americas Qualifier tournament in Antigua. He made his T20I debut on 8 November 2021, for Bermuda against the United States.

References

External links
 

1995 births
Living people
Bermudian cricketers
Bermuda Twenty20 International cricketers
Place of birth missing (living people)